Gabriel Brown (1910–1972) was an American Piedmont blues singer and guitarist.

Biography
Brown was born in Florida, probably in Gadsden County, and graduated from the Florida Agricultural and Mechanical College. In 1934, he performed at the first National Folk Festival in St. Louis, Missouri. He was musically discovered by folklorist Zora Neale Hurston. She enlisted Alan Lomax, who recorded Brown for the Library of Congress in June 1935.

Like Ralph Willis, Alec Seward and Brownie McGhee, Brown then relocated from the South to New York City. Hurston gave Brown a part in her light opera Polk County. In 1935 Brown started a four-year tenure with the Federal Arts Theatre, initially under the direction of Orson Welles. By the late 1930s, Brown performed as a singer on Cincinnati radio and took part in the show St. Louis Woman. He found employment with the civil service, working for the Army Signal Corps in Asbury Park, New Jersey. His first full recording session was in 1943, produced by Joe Davis, and the twosome worked together until Brown's final sessions in 1952.

In 1945 Brown sang, "I can't have no luck at all, the jinx is on me."
  
Several of Brown's recordings were not released during his lifetime, and some of those that were issued were not promoted tastefully or accurately. In the late 1940s, various tracks were licensed to Coral Records. Eventually Davis worked in A&R for MGM Records, and Brown followed him to that label, where he was promoted as a pop singer. Compilation albums of his recordings have been released by various labels.

Brown died by drowning after a boating accident in Florida in 1972.

Selected discography
Gabriel Brown and His Guitar 1943–1945 (Policy Wheel, 1976)
Gabriel Brown 1944–1952 (Krazy Kat, 1983)
Gabriel Brown: Mean Old Blues 1943–1948 (Flyright, 1996)
Gabriel Brown (Catfish Records, 2001)

See also
List of Piedmont blues musicians

References

External links

Illustrated Gabriel Brown discography

1910 births
1972 deaths
People from Gadsden County, Florida
American blues guitarists
American male guitarists
American blues singers
Songwriters from Florida
Deaths by drowning in the United States
Piedmont blues musicians
Blues musicians from Florida
Accidental deaths in Florida
20th-century American singers
20th-century American guitarists
Guitarists from Florida
20th-century American male singers
American male songwriters